Greek National Road 63 (abbr: EO63) is a national highway in northern Greece. It connects Serres  with Promachonas on the Bulgarian border, via Sidirokastro. It is part of the European route E79.

References

63
Roads in Central Macedonia